The following is a list of events that affected American television in 2010, a year marked by the usual debuts, cancellations, and continuations of shows; the launches, closures, or rebrandings of channels; but also significant cable/satellite carriage disputes.

Events

January

February

March

April

May

June

July

August

September

October

November

December

Television programs

Debuts

Changes of network affiliation

Returning this year

Ending this year

Made-for-TV movies and miniseries

Television stations

Station launches

Station closures

Stations changing network affiliation

Deaths

January

February

March

April

May

June

July

August

September

October

November

December

See also
 2010 in the United States
 List of American films of 2010

References

External links
 TV.com 
List of 2010 American television series at IMDb

 
2010